Rigvedadi Bhashya Bhumika (also known as Introduction To Vedas) is a book written originally in Hindi by Maharishi Dayanand Saraswati, a nineteenth-century social reformer and religious leader in India. His other notable book was Satyarth Prakash.

Purpose of the book 

The book was written with the purpose of introducing teachings of the Vedas (an ancient scripture related to Hinduism) to general people. Swami Dayananda believed that various misconceptions had been created by the interpretations of the Vedas propagated by various scholars like Sayana, Mahidhara, Wilson, Ralph T.H. Griffith, Max Muller.

References

External links 

 Original Hindi version along with English translation
Books about Hinduism